Etrumeus makiawa, or the Hawaiian red-eye round herring, is a round-herring that occurs in the Hawaiian Islands.

Taxonomy
E. makiawa was originally identified as Etrumeus micropus, but DNA analysis by Randall and DiBattista (2012) concluded that Hawaiian Etrumeus should be recognized as a distinct species, resulting in its being named after the Hawaiian name for round herrings, makiawa.

References

Clupeiformes
Fish of Hawaii
Fish described in 2012